Jim Fritzell (February 19, 1920 – March 9, 1979) was an American television and film screenwriter.

Personal background 
James Gustave Fritzell was born on February 19, 1920. He died on March 9, 1979, in Los Angeles, California. He is buried at Cypress Lawn Memorial Park 
in Colma, San Mateo County, California.

Career 
In a 22–year creative partnership, Everett Greenbaum and Fritzell won a total of three Writers' Guild awards and four Emmy Award nominations, collaborating on more than 150 scripts. These included The Real McCoys (1957–62), The Andy Griffith Show (1960–68) and the CBS TV series M*A*S*H, for which they wrote 35 episodes. He was nominated for outstanding comedy teleplay for the Season 6 premiere, "Fade Out, Fade In".

While he primarily wrote for television, he also wrote several films with Greenbaum: Good Neighbor Sam, The Ghost and Mr. Chicken, The Shakiest Gun in the West, Angel in My Pocket, and The Reluctant Astronaut.

References

External links 
 
 

1920 births
1979 deaths
American male screenwriters
American television writers
Writers from San Francisco
American male television writers
Screenwriters from California
20th-century American male writers
20th-century American screenwriters